The Medium is a 1951 Italian drama film directed by Gian Carlo Menotti. It is based on the opera of the same name and was entered into the 1952 Cannes Film Festival. It would later be screened out of competition at the 1987 Cannes Film Festival.

Plot
Madame Flora is a fraudulent medium, mother of Toby, who is mute and crippled. This condition of Toby's is important for plucking clients... During a session, Flora feels a hand squeezing her throat. She deduces that this is her son's doing and throws him out into the rain. Toby returns, to meet with Monica, his girlfriend and Flora's assistant. Flora thinks thieves have broken into the house and kills her son. Is she punished-by divine intervention?

Cast
 Marie Powers - Madame Flora
 Leopoldo Savona - Toby (as Leo Coleman)
 Belva Kibler - Mrs. Nolan
 Beverly Dame - Mrs. Gobineau
 Donald Morgan - Mr. Gobineau
 Anna Maria Alberghetti - Monica

References

External links

1951 films
1950s Italian-language films
1951 drama films
Italian black-and-white films
Films directed by Gian Carlo Menotti
Italian drama films
1950s Italian films